Fadri Mosca (born 4 November 1973) is a Swiss snowboarder. He competed in the men's giant slalom event at the 1998 Winter Olympics.

References

1973 births
Living people
Swiss male snowboarders
Olympic snowboarders of Switzerland
Snowboarders at the 1998 Winter Olympics
Place of birth missing (living people)